Mapuchemyia is a genus of flies in the family Stratiomyidae.

Species
Mapuchemyia australis (Aubertin, 1930)
Mapuchemyia krausei (Philippi, 1865)

References

Stratiomyidae
Brachycera genera
Diptera of South America